Mikail Başar (born 20 June 2001) is a Turkish footballer who plays as a forward for Serik Belediyespor.

Career
Başar made his professional debut with Antalyaspor in a 4-3 Turkish Cup win over Göztepe on 16 January 2020.

References

External links
 
 
 Antalyaspor Profile

2001 births
Sportspeople from Antalya
Living people
Turkish footballers
Association football midfielders
Antalyaspor footballers
TFF Second League players